Susek is a village in Serbia. It is situated in the Beočin municipality, in the Vojvodina province. Although, the village is geographically located in Syrmia, it is part of the South Bačka District. The village has a Serb ethnic majority and its population numbering 1,132 people (2002 census).

History
During the Axis occupation in World War II, 252 civilians were killed in Susek by fascists.

Historical population

1961: 1,502
1971: 1,440
1981: 1,217
1991: 1,137
2011: 998

See also
List of places in Serbia
List of cities, towns and villages in Vojvodina

References
Miloš Lukić, Putevima slobode - naselja opštine Beočin u ratu i revoluciji, Novi Sad, 1987.
Slobodan Ćurčić, Broj stanovnika Vojvodine, Novi Sad, 1996.

External links 

official web site of village Susek

Populated places in Syrmia
South Bačka District
Beočin
Articles containing video clips